A dead-man's vigilance device (also called the driver vigilance device or DVD for short) is a railroad safety device that operates in the case of incapacitation of the driver. It is a hybrid between a dead-man's switch and a vigilance control. The main safety failing with the basic dead-man's control system is the possibility of the operating device being permanently held in position, either deliberately or accidentally. The dead-man's vigilance device was developed to detect this condition by requiring that the dead-man's device be released momentarily and re-applied at timed intervals.

Modern practice
Modern locomotive practice is to incorporate the dead-man's and vigilance functions under the control of the alerter or the event recorder.

Warning and braking
If the timer period is beginning to expire, a visual and audible warning is given. If the operator fails to acknowledge the warning, a penalty brake application results.

Accidents due to insufficient vigilance control 
 1987 Maryland train collision
 2008 Chatsworth train collision
 Beresfield rail disaster (1997)
 Hinton train collision (1986)
 Violet Town rail accident (1969)
 Waterfall rail accident (2003)

References

External links
 FRA Regulations

Locomotive parts
Railway safety
Safety equipment